Robert Kaufman is a New York City attorney, a partner with the law firm Proskauer Rose, and a former president of the New York City Bar Association.

Education

Kaufman received his Bachelor’s Degree from Brooklyn College in 1951, his Master’s Degree from New York University in 1954; and his Juris Doctor from Brooklyn Law School in 1957, where he was Decisions editor of the Brooklyn Law Review. While attending law school, he was a Senior Economist for the New York State Division of Housing.

Career

After graduating from Brooklyn Law School, Kaufman worked for the Antitrust Division of the United States Department of Justice. He then served as a legislative assistant to New York Senator Jacob K. Javits, before joining Proskauer Rose.

At Proskauer, Kaufman’s practice has focused on health and hospital law, the law of not-for-profit corporations, multinational corporate law and personal representation. He has also been a strategist in major corporate acquisitions in the United States and Canada by the Pirelli Group and was Chairman of the Board of the Pirelli Group’s United States companies in the cable and tire industries.  He also was Chairman of the Board of Old Westbury Funds, Inc., a mutual fund group advised by Bessemer Trust Company.

Civic involvement

Among his many civic posts, Robert Kaufman has served as chairman of the Times Square Business Improvement District, and the Fund for Modern Courts, as president of the American Judicature Society, and has served on the board of the New York Community Trust as vice chairman, and is now a consulting member. He has served on the executive committees of the Legal Aid Society, New York Lawyers for the Public Interest, and Volunteers of Legal Service and is on the resource board of the National Association of Women Judges.

He is also on the board of directors of Legal Momentum (formerly the NOW Legal Defense and Education Fund), Citizens Union of the City of New York, Women's Research and Education Institute, Visiting Nurse Service of New York, VNSNY Hospice and Public Health Solutions and is a trustee of Brooklyn Law School and on the advisory board of the Alliance for National Defense. From 1986 to 1988, Kaufman also served as president of the New York City Bar Association. He has previously served as chairman of the association’s executive committee.

He is also a former member of the board of visitors of the U.S. Military Academy (West Point), the Defense Advisory Committee on Women in the Services, the judicial advisory committees to Senators Javits and Moynihan, the Administrative Conference of the United States, and the U. S. Delegation to the International Conference of Courts of Military Appeals.  He was also a member of the New York City Quadrennial Commission on Compensation of Elected Officials and chaired the New York State Board of Public Disclosure and the advisory committee to the New York State Board of Elections.

He currently serves as a special master of the Appellate Division of New York State Supreme Court and as a member of the New York City Age Friendly Commission and of the Mayor's Midtown Citizens Committee

Personal

Kaufman was born in Vienna, Austria, and came to England in 1938 on the Kindertransport and to the United States in 1939. Kaufman was married to Sheila Kelley Kaufman (1928–2009), a native of Bronxville, New York, and daughter of William J. and Jane Seymour Kelley. Read more about her here:

Sources
 Robert Kaufman Biography at Proskauer
 Robert Kaufman Biography at American Judicature Society

Living people
New York (state) lawyers
New York University alumni
Brooklyn College alumni
Brooklyn Law School alumni
Presidents of the New York City Bar Association
Proskauer Rose partners
Year of birth missing (living people)